Korhan Abay (born 1954) is a Turkish actor, author, film director and producer.

Career
Abay is a show-business icon  in Turkey, well known  for his work as an actor, writer, host and producer of numerous national and international TV shows and events. He co-hosted the 2004 Eurovision Song Contest with Meltem Cumbul. Korhan can also speak French.

Filmography
 Se upp för dårarna / Kapılara Dikkat, (2007)
 Ev Hali (as Tolga), (2002) (TV series)
 Alamancının Karısı (as Cemil), (1987)
 Büyük Koşu, (1987) (TV series)
 Kıskıvrak (as Selçuk), (1986)
 Şıpsevdi (as Raci), (1977) (TV series)
 Mahallede Şenlik Var, (1976)
 Kötüler de Ağlar, (1976)
 Canavar Cafer, (1975)
 Kazım'a Ne Lazım, (1975)
 Soysuzlar, (1975)

See also
 List of Eurovision Song Contest presenters

References

 Who is who database - Biography of Korhan Abay

External links
 

1954 births
Living people
Male actors from Istanbul
Turkish male film actors